Jean Galtier-Boissière (26 December 1891, Paris – 22 January 1966, Neuilly-sur-Seine) was a writer, polemist, and journalist from Paris, France. He founded Le Crapouillot and wrote for Le Canard enchaîné.

Bibliography
 Croquis De Tranchées. 1917
 Loin De La Rifflette. Baudinière, 1921
 La fleur au fusil. Baudinière, 1929
 Mon journal pendant l'occupation. Garas, La Jeune parque, 1944
 La belle amour. Illustrations de Jean Oberlé, Gründ, 1945
 Tradition de la trahison chez les maréchaux, suivie d'une vie de Philippe-Omer Pétain. Trémois, 1945
 Trois héros. La Jeune parque, 1947
 Mon journal dans la drôle de paix. La Jeune parque, 1947
 Mon journal dans la grande pagaïe. La Jeune parque, 1950
 Mémoires d'un parisien. La Table Ronde, 1961

External links
A complete list of Jean Galtier-Boissière works on the OCLC website.

20th-century French writers
1891 births
1966 deaths
Writers from Paris
20th-century French male writers
French male non-fiction writers
20th-century French journalists